Androula Christofidou Henriques (born 1936) is a Cypriot activist who campaigns against human trafficking.

Life
She created her own anti-human trafficking network, Cyprus Stop Trafficking. She was the president of the organization from 2012 until she resigned in 2018. She also lobbied the government of Cyprus to stop human trafficking. Her network organized an anti-trafficking conference in Cyprus in 2008 which included speakers from the United States and the EU, as well as representatives of the National Police, the House of Representatives, the Attorney General's Office, the Turkish-Cypriot community, several NGOs, and many journalists. She has also helped trafficked women by letting them stay in her home as they prepared to testify in court against those who held them as sex slaves.

She received a 2010 International Women of Courage award. In 2012 she was appointed to the rank of Commander in the National Order of Merit by France's Ambassador to Cyprus, Jean-Luc Florent.

References

Living people
Cypriot women
Cypriot activists
1936 births
Recipients of the International Women of Courage Award